Diagonal pliers (also known as wire cutters, diagonal cutting pliers, diagonal cutters, side cutters, dikes or Nippy cutters) are pliers intended for the cutting of wire (they are generally not used to grab or turn anything).   The plane defined by the cutting edges of the jaws intersects the joint rivet at an angle or "on a diagonal", hence the name.

Action 
Instead of using a shearing action as with scissors, diagonal pliers cut by indenting and wedging the wire apart.  The jaw edges are ground to a symmetrical "V" shape, thus the two jaws can be visualized to form the letter "X", as seen end-on when fully occluded.  The pliers are made of tempered steel, and inductive heating and quenching are often used to selectively harden the jaws.

Jargon 
Diags or dikes is jargon used especially in the US electrical industry to describe diagonal pliers. "Dike" can also be used as a verb, such as in the idiom "when in doubt, dike it out". 

In the United Kingdom and Ireland, diagonal pliers are commonly referred to as snips or nippers, and in  Canada, Australia and New Zealand they are often referred to as side cutters.

Insulation 
The handles of diagonal cutting pliers are commonly insulated with a dip-type or shrink fit electrically insulating material for comfort and some protection against electric shock.

Uses 
Diagonal pliers are useful for cutting copper, brass, iron, aluminium and steel wire. Lower quality versions are generally not suitable for cutting tempered steel, such as piano wire, as the jaws are not hard enough. Attempting to cut such material will usually cause indentations to be made in the jaws, or a piece to break out of one or both jaws, thus ruining the tool. However higher quality side cutters can cut hardened steel, such as 2 mm piano wire.

Variations 

For electronics work, special diagonal cutters that are ground flush to the apex of the cutting edge on one side of the jaws are often used.  These flush-cutting pliers allow wires to be trimmed flush or nearly flush to a solder joint, avoiding the sharp tip left by symmetrical diagonal cutters.  It is common for this type of diagonal cutter to be referred to by another name, such as "flush cutter" to distinguish it from symmetrical cutters.

For easier cutting of larger gauge wire, a compound-action can be employed to increase the mechanical advantage.

Some pliers for electrical work are fitted with wire-cutter blades either built into the jaws or on the handles just below the pivot.

Other variations are made to create high leverage specifically to cut through hard wire, such as electrical fence wire, dental wire, and piano wire.

Gallery

References

External links 

 Judging the quality of diagonal cutters

Pliers
Cutting tools